Olga María del Carmen Sánchez Cordero Dávila (born 16 July 1947) is a Mexican politician and former jurist. She was the Secretary of the Interior of Mexico, and the first woman to ever hold this position. She previously served as an Associate Justice on the Supreme Court of Justice of the Nation, Mexico's highest federal court, from 26 January 1995 to 30 November 2015. She currently serves as a Senator and was President of the Senate of the Republic from 2021 to 2022.

Career
Born in Mexico City, Sánchez Cordero studied law at the National Autonomous University of Mexico (UNAM). Sánchez Cordero was the first female notary public in Mexico City. She was appointed Minister (Associate Justice) of the Supreme Court of Justice of the Nation (SCJN) by Ernesto Zedillo and confirmed by the Senate on 26 January 1995. She was the ninth woman to hold a seat on the SCJN. She left on 30 November 2015.

In December 2017, Andrés Manuel López Obrador released his proposed cabinet listing and had Sánchez Cordero as his pick for Secretary of Interior.

She was a Senator in Mexico's LXIV Legislature of the Mexican Congress from September 1, 2018 until López Obrador's inauguration on December 1, 2018, when she took office as Secretary of Interior. This made her the first woman to ever hold this position.

Political views
The Economist describes her as a "social liberal ... European-style social democrat." She has announced her intention to propose decriminalization of recreational marijuana. She also intends to decriminalize abortion throughout the country.

Personal life
Olga Sánchez Cordero is married to Eduardo García Villegas and has three children.

She reported income of MXN $10,688,288 in 2019, including her salary of MXN $1,914,432 plus investments.

References

Mexican women judges
Mexican women in politics
National Autonomous University of Mexico alumni
Supreme Court of Justice of the Nation justices
People from Mexico City
Living people
1955 births
Members of the Constituent Assembly of Mexico City
Mexican Secretaries of the Interior
Morena (political party) politicians
Female interior ministers
Women Secretaries of State of Mexico
Cabinet of Andrés Manuel López Obrador
20th-century Mexican judges
21st-century Mexican judges
20th-century women judges
21st-century women judges